Daphnella levicallis is a species of sea snail, a marine gastropod mollusk in the family Raphitomidae.

Description
Daphnella levicallis is a member of the order Neogastropoda. Neogastropoda are mostly gonochoric and broadcast spawners. The embryos grow into planktonic trocophore larvae, then later into juvenile veligers.

Distribution
This species occurs in the Sea of Cortez, Western Mexico.

References

 Poorman, L. H. "New Molluscan Species (Gastropoda, Neogastropoda) from the Tropical Eastern Pacific." Veliger 26.1 (1983): 5–9.

External links
 Gastropods.com: Daphnella levicallis
 

levicallis
Gastropods described in 1983